Aidan Shipley (born December 11, 1992) is a Canadian actor and filmmaker, most noted as co-director with Grayson Moore of the 2017 film Cardinals.

Career
A native of Stratford, Ontario, he began his acting career in supporting stage roles at the Stratford Festival, before studying acting and filmmaking at Ryerson University. His acting roles have included appearances in the television series Overruled!, Pure Pwnage, Baxter, What's Up Warthogs!, Flashpoint and Murdoch Mysteries, and the films Vacation with Derek, Red Lights, Bunks, Running Season, The Captive and Natasha.

Shipley, Moore, Connor Illsley, and Jon Riera won the Canadian Screen Award for Best Direction in a Web Program or Series at the 7th Canadian Screen Awards in 2019, for the short film Deerbrook.

Filmography

Film

Television

Filmmaker work
Films

Shorts films

Television

Awards and nominations

References

External links

1992 births
21st-century Canadian male actors
Canadian male film actors
Canadian male television actors
Canadian male stage actors
Film directors from Ontario
Male actors from Ontario
People from Stratford, Ontario
Toronto Metropolitan University alumni
Canadian Screen Award winners
Living people